Norman Triplett (October 18, 1892 – October 20, 1918) was an American Negro league outfielder in the 1910s.

A native of La Mott, Pennsylvania, Triplett played for the Hilldale Club in 1917. In two recorded games, he posted two hits with an RBI in eight plate appearances. Triplett died of pneumonia in 1918 at age 26 while serving in the US Army in France during World War I.

References

External links
Baseball statistics and player information from Baseball-Reference Black Baseball Stats and Seamheads
Norman Triplett at Find A Grave

1892 births
1918 deaths
Place of death missing
Hilldale Club players
United States Army personnel of World War I
American military personnel killed in World War I
20th-century African-American sportspeople
Deaths from pneumonia in France